Diana Margaret Green  (born 10 April 1943) is a British economist and academic, and a former vice-chancellor.

Early life
She attended South Park High School for Girls (a former girls' grammar school) in Lincoln, also known as South Park Girls' High School; Lincoln went comprehensive in 1974. She has said of her time at her grammar school Going to a grammar school was critical in terms of my career. I was encouraged to be ambitious.

She attended the University of Reading, gained a BSc in Economics from Queen Mary College, and a PhD in Economics in 1976.

Career
From 1984-87 she was Head of Department at Birmingham Polytechnic. She stayed at the University of Central England until 1998. She is on the Advisory Board of the Campaign for Science and Engineering. From 1998-99 she was the Chairman of the Society for Research into Higher Education (SRHE).

Vice Chancellor
She became Vice-Chancellor of Sheffield Hallam University in 1998.

She is also Vice Chair of London Film School.

Personal life

She first married in 1967, divorcing in 1979. She married again in 2011 to John William Davy. She was appointed a CBE in 2007. She has a pilot's licence.

References

External links
 BBC Paintings

 

1943 births
Academics of Birmingham City University
Academics of Sheffield Hallam University
Alumni of Queen Mary University of London
Commanders of the Order of the British Empire
British women economists
English economists
People educated at South Park High School, Lincoln
People from Lincoln, England
Living people